Shaktism is one of several major Hindu denominations, wherein the metaphysical reality is considered metaphorically a woman and Shakti (Mahadevi) is regarded as the supreme godhead. It includes many goddesses, all considered aspects of the same supreme goddess. Shaktism has different sub-traditions, ranging from those focused on most worshipped Durga, gracious Parvati to that of fierce Kali.

The Sruti and Smriti texts of Hinduism are an important historical framework of the Shaktism tradition. In addition, it reveres the texts Devi Mahatmya, the Devi-Bhagavata Purana, Kalika Purana and Shakta Upanishads such as the Devi Upanishad. The Devi Mahatmya in particular, is considered in Shaktism to be as important as the Bhagavad Gita.

Shaktism is known for its various sub-traditions of tantra, as well as a galaxy of goddesses with respective systems. It consists of the Vidyapitha and Kulamārga. The pantheon of goddesses in Shaktism grew after the decline of Buddhism in India, wherein Hindu and Buddhist goddesses were combined to form the Mahavidya, a list of ten goddesses. The most common aspects of Devi found in Shaktism include Durga, Kali, Saraswati, Lakshmi, Parvati and Tripurasundari. The goddess-focused tradition is very popular in eastern India particularly West Bengal, Odisha, Bihar, Jharkhand, Tripura and Assam, which it celebrates festivals such as the Durga puja, which is popular in West Bengal and Odisha.

Shaktism also emphasizes that intense love of deity is more important than simple obedience, thus showing the influence of Vaishnava idea where passionate relationship between Radha and Krishna is also the ideal relationship. These older ideas still influence modern Shaktism. Similarly, Shaktism's ideas have also influenced Vaishnavism and Shaivism traditions. In Shaktism, the goddess is considered as the Shakti/Energy of Vishnu and Shiva respectively, and revered prominently in numerous Hindu temples and festivals.

Origins and history

The earliest archaeological evidence of what appears to be an Upper Paleolithic shrine for Shakti worship were discovered in the terminal upper paleolithic site of Baghor I (Baghor stone) in Sidhi district of Madhya Pradesh, India. The excavations, carried out under the guidance of noted archaeologists G. R. Sharma of Allahabad University and J. Desmond Clark of University of California and assisted by Jonathan Mark Kenoyer and J.N. Pal, dated the Baghor formation to between 9000 B.C and 8000 B.C.
The origins of Shakti worship can also be traced to Indus Valley civilization.
Among the earliest evidence of reverence for the female aspect of God in Hinduism is this passage in chapter 10.125 of the Rig Veda, also called the Devi Suktam hymn:

The Vedic literature reveres various goddesses, but far less frequently than Gods Indra, Agni and Soma. Yet, they are declared equivalent aspects of the neutral Brahman, of Prajapati and Purusha. The goddesses often mentioned in the Vedic layers of text include the Ushas (dawn), Vāc (speech, wisdom), Sarasvati (as river), Prithivi (earth), Nirriti (annihilator), Shraddha (faith, confidence). Goddesses such as Uma appear in the Upanishads as another aspect of divine and the knower of ultimate knowledge (Brahman), such as in section 3 and 4 of the ancient Kena Upanishad.

Hymns to goddesses are in the ancient Hindu epic Mahabharata, particularly in the Harivamsa section, which was a late addition (100 to 300 CE) to the work. The archaeological and textual evidence implies, states Thomas Coburn, that the goddess had become as prominent as God in Hindu tradition by about the third or fourth century. The literature on Shakti theology grew in ancient India, climaxing in one of the most important texts of Shaktism called the Devi Mahatmya. This text, states C. Mackenzie Brown – a professor of Religion, is both a culmination of centuries of Indian ideas about the divine woman, as well as a foundation for the literature and spirituality focussed on the female transcendence in centuries that followed. The Devi-Mahatmya is not the earliest literary fragment attesting to the existence of devotion to a goddess figure, states Thomas B. Coburn – a professor of Religious Studies, but "it is surely the earliest in which the object of worship is conceptualized as goddess, with a capital G".

Other important texts of Shaktism include the Shakta Upanishads, as well as Shakta-oriented Upa Puranic literature such as the Devi Purana and Kalika Purana, the Lalita Sahasranama (from the Brahmanda Purana). The Tripura Upanishad is historically the most complete introduction to Shakta Tantrism, distilling into its 16 verses almost every important topic in Shakta Tantra tradition. Along with the Tripura Upanishad, the Tripuratapini Upanishad has attracted scholarly bhasya (commentary) in the second half of 2nd-millennium, such as the work of  Bhaskararaya, and  Ramanand. These texts link the Shakti Tantra tradition as a Vedic attribute, however this link has been contested by scholars.

The 18th-century Shakta bhakti poems and songs were composed by two Bengal court poets, Bharatchandra Ray and Ramprasad Sen, as well as the Tamil collection Abhirami Anthadhi.

Shakta-universalist Sri Ramakrishna, one of the most influential figures of the Hindu reform movements, believed that all Hindu goddesses are manifestations of the same mother goddess.

Theology

Shaktas conceive the goddess as the supreme, ultimate, eternal reality of all existence, or same as the Brahman concept of Hinduism. She is considered to be simultaneously the source of all creation, its embodiment and the energy that animates and governs it, and that into which everything will ultimately dissolve. Maha Devi said in Devi Upanishad, verse 2, "I am essentially Brahman". According to V. R. Ramachandra Dikshitar – a professor of Indian history, in Shaktism theology "Brahman is static Shakti and Shakti is dynamic Brahman."

Shaktism views the Devi as the source, essence and substance of everything in creation. Its texts such as the Devi-Bhagavata Purana states:

Shaktism's focus on the Divine Female does not imply a rejection of the male. It rejects masculine-feminine, male-female, soul-body, transcendent-immanent dualism, considering nature as divine. Devi is considered to be the cosmos itself – she is the embodiment of energy, matter and soul, the motivating force behind all action and existence in the material universe. Yet in Shaktism, states C. MacKenzie Brown, the cultural concepts of masculine and the feminine as they exist among practitioners of Shaktism are aspects of the divine, transcendent reality. In Hindu iconography, the cosmic dynamic of male-female or masculine-feminine interdependence and equivalence, is expressed in the half-Shakti, half-Shiva deity known as Ardhanari.

The philosophical premises in many Shakta texts, states June McDaniel – a professor of Religious Studies, is syncretism of Samkhya and Advaita Vedanta schools of Hindu philosophy, called Shaktadavaitavada (literally, the path of nondualistic Shakti).

The Hindu monk Swami Vivekananda, remarked thus; about being an actual Shakti worshipper: 
"Do you know who is the real "Shakti-worshipper"? It is he who knows that God is the omnipresent force in the universe and sees in women the manifestation of that Force."

Devi Gita
The seventh book of the Srimad Devi-Bhagavatam presents the theology of Shaktism. This book is called Devi Gita, or the "Song of the Goddess". The goddess explains she is the Brahman that created the world, asserting the Advaita premise that spiritual liberation occurs when one fully comprehends the identity of one's soul and the Brahman. This knowledge, asserts the goddess, comes from detaching self from the world and meditating on one's own soul.

The Devi Gita, like the Bhagavad Gita, is a condensed philosophical treatise. It presents the divine female as a powerful and compassionate creator, pervader and protector of the universe. She is presented in the opening chapter of the Devi Gita as the benign and beautiful world-mother, called Bhuvaneshvari (literally, ruler of the universe). Thereafter, the text presents its theological and philosophical teachings.

The Devi Gita describes the Devi (or goddess) as "universal, cosmic energy" resident within each individual. It thus weaves in the terminology of Samkhya school of Hindu philosophy. The text is suffused with Advaita Vedanta ideas, wherein nonduality is emphasized, all dualities are declared as incorrect, and interconnected oneness of all living being's soul with Brahman is held as the liberating knowledge. However, adds Tracy Pintchman – a professor of Religious Studies and Hinduism, Devi Gita incorporates Tantric ideas giving the Devi a form and motherly character rather than the gender-neutral concept of Adi Shankara's Advaita Vedanta.

List of 8 Shakta Upanishads

Tantra
Sub-traditions of Shaktism include "Tantra", which refers to techniques, practices and ritual grammar involving mantra, yantra, nyasa, mudra and certain elements of traditional kundalini yoga, typically practiced under the guidance of a qualified guru after due initiation (diksha) and oral instruction to supplement various written sources. There has been a historic debate between Shakta theologians on whether its tantric practices are Vedic or non-Vedic.

The roots of Shakta Tantrism are unclear, probably ancient and independent of the Vedic tradition of Hinduism. The interaction between Vedic and Tantric traditions trace back to at least the sixth century, and the surge in Tantra tradition developments during the late medieval period, states Geoffrey Samuel, were a means to confront and cope with Islamic invasions and political instability in and after the 14th century CE.

Notable Shakta tantras are Saradatilaka Tantra of Lakshmanadesika (11th century), Kali Tantra (c. 15th century), Yogini Tantra, Sarvanandanatha's Sarvolassa Tantra, Brahmananda Giri's Saktananda Tarangini with Tararahasya and Purnananda Giri's Syamarahasya with Sritattvacintamani (16th century), Krishananda Agamavagisa's Tantrasara and Raghunatna Tarkavagisa Bhattacarya Agamatattvavilasa (17th century), as well as works of Bhaskaracharya (18th century).

Principal deities

Shaktas approach the Devi in many forms; however, they are all considered to be but diverse aspects of the one supreme goddess. The primary Devi form worshiped by a Shakta devotee is his or her ishta-devi, that is a personally selected Devi. The selection of this deity can depend on many factors such as family tradition, regional practice, guru lineage and personal resonance.

Some forms of the goddess are widely known in the Hindu world. The common goddesses of Shaktism, popular in the Hindu thought at least by about mid 1st-millennium CE, include Parvati, Durga, Kali, Yogmaya, Lakshmi, Saraswati, Gayatri, Radha and Sita. The rarer forms of Devi found among tantric Shakta are the Mahavidyas, particularly Tripura Sundari, Bhuvaneshvari, Tara, Bhairavi, Chhinnamasta, Dhumavati, Bagalamukhi, Matangi and Kamala. Other major goddess groups include the Sapta-Matrika ("Seven Little Mothers"), "who are the energies of different major Gods, and described as assisting the great Shakta Devi in her fight with demons", and the 64 Yoginis. Eight forms of goddess Lakshmi are called Ashtalakshmi and the nine forms of goddess Durga, the Navadurgas worshipped in Navratri.

Tantric traditions

Vidyāpīṭha
The Vidyāpīṭha is subdivided into Vāmatantras, Yāmalatantras, and Śaktitantras.

Kulamārga
The Kulamārga preserves some of the distinctive features of the Kāpālika tradition, from which it is derived. It is subdivided into four subcategories of texts based on the goddesses Kuleśvarī, Kubjikā, Kālī and Tripurasundarī respectively.  The Trika texts are closely related to the Kuleśvarī texts and can be considered as part of the Kulamārga.

Worship
Shaktism encompasses a nearly endless variety of beliefs and practices – from animism to philosophical speculation of the highest order – that seek to access the Shakti (Divine Energy or Power) that is believed to be the Devi's nature and form. Its two largest and most visible schools are the Srikula (family of Tripura Sundari), strongest in South India, and the Kalikula (family of Kali), which prevails in northern and eastern India.

Srikula: family of Lalita Tripura Sundari 

The Srikula (family of Sri ) tradition (sampradaya) focuses worship on Devi in the form of the goddess Lalita-Tripura Sundari. Rooted in first-millennium. Srikula became a force in South India no later than the seventh century, and is today the prevalent form of Shaktism practiced in South Indian regions such as Kerala, Tamil Nadu and Tamil areas of Sri Lanka.

The Srikula's best-known school is Srividya, "one of Shakta Tantrism's most influential and theologically sophisticated movements." Its central symbol, the Sri Chakra, is probably the most famous visual image in all of Hindu Tantric tradition. Its literature and practice is perhaps more systematic than that of any other Shakta sect.

Srividya largely views the goddess as "benign [saumya] and beautiful [saundarya]" (in contrast to Kalikula's focus on "terrifying [ugra] and horrifying [ghora]" Goddess forms such as Kali or Durga). In Srikula practice, moreover, every aspect of the goddess – whether malignant or gentle – is identified with Lalita.

Srikula adepts most often worship Lalita using the abstract Sri Chakra yantra, which is regarded as her subtle form. The Sri Chakra can be visually rendered either as a two-dimensional diagram (whether drawn temporarily as part of the worship ritual, or permanently engraved in metal) or in the three-dimensional, pyramidal form known as the Sri Meru. It is not uncommon to find a Sri Chakra or Sri Meru installed in South Indian temples, because – as modern practitioners assert – "there is no disputing that this is the highest form of Devi and that some of the practice can be done openly. But what you see in the temples is not the srichakra worship you see when it is done privately."

The Srividya paramparas can be further broadly subdivided into two streams, the Kaula (a vamamarga practice) and the Samaya (a dakshinamarga practice). The Kaula or Kaulachara, first appeared as a coherent ritual system in the 8th century in central India, and its most revered theorist is the 18th-century philosopher Bhaskararaya, widely considered "the best exponent of Shakta philosophy."

The Samaya or Samayacharya finds its roots in the work of the 16th-century commentator Lakshmidhara, and is "fiercely puritanical [in its] attempts to reform Tantric practice in ways that bring it in line with high-caste brahmanical norms." Many Samaya practitioners explicitly deny being either Shakta or Tantric, though scholars argues that their cult remains technically both. The Samaya-Kaula division marks "an old dispute within Hindu Tantrism," and one that is vigorously debated to this day.

Kalikula: family of Kali

The Kalikula (Family of Kali) form of Shaktism is most dominant in northeastern India, and is most widely prevalent in West Bengal, Assam, Bihar and Odisha, as well as Nepal and Kerala. The goddesses Kubjika, Kulesvari, Chamunda, Chandi, Shamshan Kali (goddess of the cremation ground), Dakshina Kali, and Siddheshwari are worshipped in the region of Bengal to protect against disease and smallpox as well as ill omens. Kalikula lineages focus upon the Devi as the source of wisdom (vidya) and liberation (moksha). The tantric part generally stand "in opposition to the brahmanic tradition," which they view as "overly conservative and denying the experiential part of religion."

The main deities of the Kalikula tradition are Kali, Chandi, Bheema and Durga. Other goddesses that enjoy veneration are Tara and all the other Mahavidyas, Kaumari as well as regional goddesses such as Manasa, the snake goddesses, Ṣaṣṭī, the protectress of children, Śītalā, the smallpox goddess, and Umā (the Bengali name for Parvati) — all of them, again, considered aspects of the Divine Mother.

In Nepal devi is mainly worshipped as the goddess Bhavani. She is one of the important Hindu deities in Nepal.
Two major centers of Shaktism in West Bengal are Kalighat where the skull of Kali is believed to be worshipped along with her 25 forms. The kali ghat temple is located in Calcutta and Tarapith in Birbhum district. In Calcutta, emphasis is on devotion (bhakti) to the goddess as Kali. Where the goddess(kali) is seen as the destroyer of evil.:

At Tarapith, Devi's manifestation as Tara ("She Who Saves") or Ugratara ("Fierce Tara") is ascendant, as the goddess who gives liberation (kaivalyadayini). [...] The forms of sadhana performed here are more yogic and tantric than devotional, and they often involve sitting alone at the [cremation] ground, surrounded by ash and bone. There are shamanic elements associated with the Tarapith tradition, including "conquest of the Goddess, exorcism, trance, and control of spirits."

The philosophical and devotional underpinning of all such ritual, however, remains a pervasive vision of the Devi as supreme, absolute divinity. As expressed by the 19th-century saint Ramakrishna, one of the most influential figures in modern Bengali Shaktism:

Festivals
Shaktas celebrate most major Hindu festivals, as well as a huge variety of local, temple- or deity-specific observances. A few of the more important events are listed below:

Navaratri

The most important Shakta festival is Navaratri (lit., "Festival of Nine Nights"), also known as "Sharad Navaratri" because it falls during the Hindu month of Sharad (October/November). This is the festival that worships the Navadurgas, forms of Devi. This festival – often taken together with the following tenth day, known as Dusshera or Vijayadashami – celebrates the goddess Durga's victory over a series of powerful demons described in the Devi Mahatmya. In Bengal, the last four days of Navaratri are called Durga Puja, and mark one episode in particular: Durga's iconic slaying of Mahishasura (lit., the "Buffalo Demon"). Durga Puja also became the main religio-cultural celebration within the Bengal diaspora in the West (together with Kali and Sarasvati Pujas, if a community enough big and rich).

While Hindus of all denominations celebrate the autumn Navratri festival, Shaktas also celebrate two additional Navratris – one in the spring and one in the summer. The spring festival is known as Vasanta Navaratri or Chaitra Navatri, and celebrated in the Hindu month of Chaitra (March/April). Srividya lineages dedicate this festival to Devi's form as the goddess Tripura Sundari. The summer festival is called Ashada Navaratri, as it is held during the Hindu month of Ashadha (June/July). The Vaishno Devi temple in Jammu, with Vaishno Devi considered an aspect of Durga, celebrates Navaratri.  Ashada Navaratri, on the other hand, is considered particularly auspicious for devotees of the boar-headed Goddess Varahi, one of the seven Matrikas named in the Devi Mahatmya.

Vasant Panchami

Diwali and others

Lakshmi Puja is a part of Durga Puja celebrations by Shaktas, where Laksmi symbolizes the goddess of abundance and autumn harvest. Lakshmi's biggest festival, however, is Diwali (or Deepavali; the "Festival of Lights"), a major Hindu holiday celebrated across India and in Nepal as Tihar. In North India, Diwali marks the beginning of the traditional New Year, and is held on the night of the new moon in the Hindu month of Kartik (usually October or November). Shaktas (and many non-Shaktas) celebrate it as another Lakshmi Puja, placing small oil lamps outside their homes and praying for the goddess's blessings.  Diwali coincides with the celebration of Kali Puja, popular in Bengal, and some Shakta traditions focus their worship on Devi as Parvati rather than Lakshmi.

Jagaddhatri Puja is celebrated on the last four days of the Navaratis, following Kali Puja. It is very similar to Durga Puja in its details and observance, and is especially popular in Bengal and some other parts of Eastern India. Gauri Puja is performed on the fifth day after Ganesh Chaturthi, during Ganesha Puja in Western India, to celebrate the arrival of Gauri, Mother of Ganesha where she brings her son back home.

Major Shakta temple festivals are Meenakshi Kalyanam and Ambubachi Mela. The Meenakshi Kalyanam is a part of the Chithirai Thiruvizha festival in Madurai around April/May, one of the largest festivals in South India, celebrating the wedding of goddess Meenakshi (Parvati) and Shiva. The festival is one where both the Vaishnava and Shaiva communities join the celebrations, because Vishnu gives away his sister Parvati in marriage to Shiva. Ambubachi Mela or Ameti is a celebration of the menstruation of the goddess, by hundreds of thousands of devotees, in a festival held in June/July (during the monsoon season) at Kamakhya Temple, Guwahati, Assam. Here the Devi is worshiped in the form of a yoni-like stone, and the site is one of Shakta Pitha or pilgrimage sites in Shaktism.

Animal sacrifice

Shaktism tradition practices animal sacrifice to revere goddesses such as Kali in many parts of India but particularly in the eastern states of India and Nepal. This is either an actual animal, or a vegetable or sweet dish substitute considered equivalent to the animal. In many cases, Shaktism devotees consider animal sacrifice distasteful, and practice alternate means of expressing devotion while respecting the views of others in their tradition.

In Nepal, West Bengal, Odisha and Assam, animal sacrifices are performed at Shakti temples, particularly to mark the legend of goddess Durga slaying the buffalo demon. This involves slaying of a goat or a male water buffalo. Animal sacrifice is also an essential component as part of the Kaula tantra school of Shaktism. This practice is rare among Hindus, outside this region.

In Bengal, animal sacrifice ritual follows the guidelines in texts such as Mahanirvana Tantra.These ritual includes selecting the animal, then a priest offers a prayer to the animal, then recites the Gayatri Mantra in its ear before killing it. The meat of the sacrificed animal is then cooked and eaten by the Shakta devotees.

In Nepal, animal sacrifice en masse occurs during the three-day-long Gadhimai festival. In 2009 it was speculated that more than 250,000 animals were sacrificed during this event.

In Odisha, during the Bali Jatra, Shaktism devotees sacrifice male goats to the goddess Samaleswari in her temple in Sambalpur, Orissa.

The Rajput of Rajasthan worship their weapons and horses on Navratri, and formerly offered a sacrifice of a goat to a goddess revered as Kuldevi – a practice that continues in some places. The ritual requires slaying of the animal with a single stroke. In the past this ritual was considered a rite of passage into manhood and readiness as a warrior. The ritual is directed by a priest. The Kuldevi among these Rajput communities is a warrior-pativrata guardian goddess, with local legends tracing reverence for her during Rajput-Muslim wars.

Animal Sacrifice of a buffalo or goat, particularly during smallpox epidemics, has been practiced in parts of South India. The sacrificed animal is dedicated to a goddess, and is probably related to the myth of goddess Kali in Andhra Pradesh, but in Karnataka, the typical goddess is Renuka. According to Alf Hiltebeitel – a professor of Religions, History and Human Sciences, these ritual animal sacrifices, with some differences, mirrors goddess - related ritual animal sacrifice found in Gilgamesh epic and in texts of Egyptian, Minoan and Greek sources.

In the 19th century through the early 20th century, Indian laborers were shipped by the British Empire into colonial mining and plantations operations in the Indian ocean and the Caribbean regions. These included significant number of Shakta devotees. While instances of Shakta animal sacrifice during Kali puja in the Caribbean islands were recorded between 1850s to 1920s, these were relatively uncommon when compared to other rituals such as temple prayers, community dancing and fire walking.

Shaktism versus other Hindu traditions

Shaktism has at times been dismissed as a superstitious, black magic-infested practice that hardly qualifies as a true religion at all.   A representative criticism of this sort issued from an Indian scholar in the 1920s:

The tantra practices are secretive, subject to speculations and criticism. Scholars variously attribute such criticism to ignorance, misunderstanding or sectarian bias on the part of some observers, as well as unscrupulous practices by some Shaktas. These are some of the reasons many Hindus question the relevance and historicity of Tantra to their tradition.

Beyond tantra, the Shakta sub-traditions subscribe to various philosophies, are similar in some aspects and differ in others. These traditions compare with Vaishnavism, Shaivism and Smartism as follows:

Demography
There is no census data available on demographic history or trends for Shaktism or other traditions within Hinduism. Estimates vary on the relative number of adherents in Shaktism compared to other traditions of Hinduism. According to a 2010 estimate by Johnson and Grim, the Shaktism tradition is the smaller group with about 30 million or 3.2% of Hindus. Large shakta communities are  particularly  found in eastern states, such as West Bengal, Assam, Bihar, Odisha, Jharkhand and Tripura with substantial communities also existing in Punjab, Jammu, Himachal Pradesh, Gujarat and Central India. In West Bengal Shaktas belong to the upper castes as well as lowest castes and tribes, while the lower middle castes are Vaishnavas. In contrast, Galvin Flood states that Shaivism and Shaktism traditions are difficult to separate, as many Shaiva Hindus revere the goddess Shakti regularly. The denominations of Hinduism, states Julius Lipner, are unlike those found in major religions of the world, because Hindu denominations are fuzzy with individuals revering gods and goddesses henotheistically, with many Shaiva and Vaishnava adherents recognizing Sri (Lakshmi), Parvati, Saraswati and other aspects of the goddess Devi. Similarly, Shakta Hindus revere Shiva and goddesses such as Parvati (such as Durga, Radha, Sita and others) and Saraswati important in Shaiva and Vaishnava traditions.

Temples and influence

Shakta temples are found all over South Asia. Many towns, villages and geographic landmarks are named for various forms of the Devi. Major pilgrimage sites of Shaktism are called "Shakti Peethas", literally "Seats of the Devi". These vary from four to fifty one.

Some Shakta temples are also found in Southeast Asia, the Americas, Europe, Australia and elsewhere. Examples in the United States include the Kali Mandir in Laguna Beach, California; and Sri Rajarajeswari Peetam, a Srividya temple in rural Rush, New York.

Some feminists and participants in New Age spirituality who are attracted to Goddess worship", suggest Shaktism is a "symbol of wholeness and healing, associated especially with repressed female power and sexuality."

Buddhism
There has been a significant sharing of ideas, ritual grammar and concepts between Tantric Buddhism (Vajrayana tradition) found in Nepal and Tibet and the Tantric Shakta tradition of Hinduism. Both movements cherish female deities. According to Miranda Shaw, "the confluence of Buddhism and Shaktism is such that Tantric Buddhism could properly be called Shakta Buddhism".

The Buddhist Aurangabad Caves about 100 kilometers from the Ajanta Caves, dated to the 6th to 7th century CE, show Buddhist Matrikas (mother goddesses of Shaktism) next to the Buddha. Other goddesses in these caves include Durga. The goddess iconography in these Buddhist caves is close, but not identical to the Hindu Shakta tradition. The "seven Goddess mothers" are found in other Buddhist caves and literature, such as their discussion in the Buddhist text Manjusrimulakalpa and Vairocanabhisambodhi.

Jainism
In Jainism, ideas similar to Shaktism tradition are found, such as the Vidyadevis and the Shasanadevis.

Sikhism
The secondary scripture of Sikhs, Dasam Granth attributed to Guru Gobind Singh, includes numerous sections on Shakta goddesses, particularly Chandi – the fierce warrior form of the Hindu goddess. According to Nikky-Guninder Kaur Singh – a professor of Religious Studies, the stories about goddess Durga in the Dasam Granth are reworkings of ancient Shakti mythologies. A significant part of this Sikh scripture is based on the teachings in the Shakta text Devi Mahatmya found in the Markandeya Purana of Hinduism.

See also

References

Notes

Citations

Works cited

 

Manna, Sibendu. Mother Goddess, . Punthi Pustak, Calcutta, 1993.

 Nanda, Jyotir Maya. Mysticism of the Devi Mahatmya Worship of the Divine Mother. South Miami, Fla: Yoga Research Foundation, 1994.

Further reading

External links

  Śākta Traditions
 Women in Hindu Shakta Tantra

 
Hindu denominations